Anikó Iglói (11 November 1908 – 12 April 2003) was a Hungarian alpine skier. She competed in two events at the 1948 Winter Olympics.

References

1908 births
2003 deaths
Hungarian female alpine skiers
Olympic alpine skiers of Hungary
Alpine skiers at the 1948 Winter Olympics
People from Kremnica
Sportspeople from the Banská Bystrica Region